, full name , also known as the Sony Cat, is a fictional character created by Sony Interactive Entertainment. He is an anthropomorphized cat who participates in numerous events and tries to act like a human.

Toro first appeared in the PlayStation game Doko Demo Issho, while not as popular in the west, he serves as Sony's mascot in Japan - in particular, of the PlayStation Network.

Character
The character is an anthropomorphized white Japanese bobtail cat of a chibi design style. Toro is characterized by its big, trapezoid-shaped face, a rectangular-shaped body, and its vast variety of face expressions. Toro's family name originated from a debugger called Toro 'Inoue' (井上 Inoue).

Character profile:
Birthday: 6 May
Favorite foods: chūtoro, oratosquilla oratoria, nattō roll
Dislikes: to be put in a cardboard box

Video game appearances
Toro first appeared on 22 July 1999 as the main character (chatterbot) in the video game Doko Demo Issho (also translated as Doko Demo Issyo and meaning "Together Anywhere") on the Sony PlayStation, and included support for the PocketStation. The game won the Japan Game Awards' Game of the Year award alongside Final Fantasy VII.

In 2004, Doko Demo Issho was released on the PlayStation Portable, a free demo being available in the Japanese PlayStation Store.

Toro stars in the PlayStation 3 title Mainichi Issho ("Everyday Together"), a talk show-like game where Toro delivers daily news together with Kuro, his black cat neighbor. Players can also answer trivia to win game money (Myale) and prizes such as to decorate Toro's in-game apartment; an online IQ versus test gameis also possible. Mainichi Issho is available free of charge download in the Japanese PlayStation only. A sequel to game titled Weekly Toro Station was in November 2009 as a replacement for Issho.

Toro is a playable character in Everybody's Golf 5. He also as a playable in PlayStation All-Stars Battle Royale, with Kuro assisting him during one of his super attacks.

Toro is the main character of the free downloadable PlayStation Vita game Toro's Friend Network, in which the player must help him make friends so that he can save Kuro who has been kidnapped.

Toro now stars in Toro Puzzle which was released for Android and iOS in Japan In 2019 and later released in North America in 2020 as Toro and Friends: Onsen Town.

Also appeared (or at least a cat that looks like him) in Syobon Action (Cat Mario), as the playable character.

Guest and cameo appearances
Toro and Kuro both appear as exclusive fighters for the PlayStation 3 and PlayStation Vita versions of Street Fighter X Tekken by Capcom, in which Toro mimics Ryu's fighting style, while Kuro mimics Kazuya's fighting style. This was their first game appearance outside Japan, predating PlayStation All-Stars Battle Royale (both are fighting games that were released in 2012). Toro and Kuro appear in Hatsune Miku: Project DIVA F (available with the "Popipo Special Edition" downloadable content), where their appearances are used for multiple accessories and they star in the "PoPiPo (Toro and Kuro special edition)" PV.

Toro and Kuro both appear as NPCs during specific quests in White Knight Chronicles 2. Toro and Kuro also appear in the MMO Phantasy Star Online 2 as Vita and PS4 exclusive NPCs that the players can take with them on missions, and can eventually get them as MAGs for their characters. Toro and Kuro are playable DLC characters in Everybody’s Golf 6. Toro is summonable by the player in Destiny of Spirits. Toro and Kuro make an appearance in Danganronpa Another Episode: Ultra Despair Girls in a Monokuma assembly line. Toro also appeared as a DLC bomber in the September 2018 update to Super Bomberman R.

Toro costumes appear in LittleBigPlanet (available as a downloadable content), and in Tales of Graces f and Tales of Hearts R. Sony also made Toro and Kuro a free DLC plush for the player's character to wear in Tokyo Jungle for the PlayStation Network.

References

External links
Doko Demo Issyo official website 

Animal characters in video games
Anthropomorphic video game characters
Corporate mascots
Fictional cats
Cat mascots
Fictional golfers
Male characters in advertising
Male characters in video games
Sony
Sony Interactive Entertainment characters
Sony Interactive Entertainment franchises
Video game characters introduced in 1999
Video game mascots
Video game marketing